Halodarcia is a genus of mites in the family Halolaelapidae. There are at least two described species in Halodarcia.

Species
These two species belong to the genus Halodarcia:
 Halodarcia incideta Karg, 1969
 Halodarcia porolata Karg, 1969

References

Mesostigmata
Articles created by Qbugbot
Taxa named by Wolfgang Karg